"Tell Me" is the second single from Diddy's 2006 album, Press Play. The song features Christina Aguilera and is produced by Just Blaze. According to All Access, the single hit radio stations on November 7, 2006.

Background and composition
The song was co-written by R&B singer–songwriters Static Major and Yummy Bingham. Diddy's rap was written with Royce da 5'9". "Tell Me" is written in the key of A minor with a tempo of 99 beats per minute.

Critical reception
Andy Kellman of AllMusic highlighted this song on album. Los Angeles Times editors Natalie Nichols and Serena Kim wrote that Diddy gives Aguilera a "task on the club-thumping." Mike Joseph of PopMatters wrote that: "Pop princess Christina Aguilera serves as little more than hook girl on her guest spot."

Commercial performance
The song reached the top 10 in the United Kingdom, reaching number eight, and entered the top 20 in 15 countries. The song debuted on the Top 75 singles chart in the UK at number 20, based on download sales alone, during the week ending December 10. In the United States, "Tell Me" charted at number 47 on the Billboard Hot 100, becoming Diddy's lowest-charting single since "Diddy" peaked at number 66 in 2001.

Music video
The video for "Tell Me" was shot during the last week of September 2006 in Los Angeles and was directed by Erik White. The video was premiered on TRL October 30, 2006. The video entered the TRL charts two days later at number 10. In the UK the video was premiered on the November 17, 2006, being the same day Aguilera kicked off her world tour.

The video begins with Diddy in a virtually empty white room except for the stereo equipment mentioned above, with the track "Diddy Rock" (feat. Timbaland), another track from Press Play, playing in the background. After his attractive female assistant asks Diddy if he wants her to "press play", the speakers and TV turn on and the track begins. While Diddy raps he is blown away by the power of the speakers, and Aguilera is seen on the television. By the time Aguilera's catchy hook comes in, the white room has shattered and Diddy and Aguilera are seen on either side of a fan in some sort of dark wind tunnel. It is now seen that Aguilera has donned a classy, ****, yet modern look for the video, in contrast to the 1920s and 30s glamorous look she has used to promote her own album.

This setting then shatters in the middle of the second verse to feature clips of the two performers, as well as backup dancers, performing in front of flashing neon lights. As the song ends, the camera zooms out to show that the lights form the promotional "Press Play" symbol associated with the album.

Track listing
CD single
"Tell Me" (Explicit Album Version) (featuring Christina Aguilera) - 4:06
"Tell Me" (Instrumental) (featuring Christina Aguilera) - 4:26
"Tell Me" (A Cappella) (featuring Christina Aguilera) - 4:36
"Come to Me" (Explicit Version) (featuring Nicole Scherzinger, Yung Joc, Young Dro & T.I.) - 3:51

Charts

Weekly charts

Year-end charts

Certifications

References

2006 singles
Christina Aguilera songs
Sean Combs songs
Bad Boy Records singles
Song recordings produced by Just Blaze
Songs written by Sean Combs
Music videos directed by Erik White
Songs written by Royce da 5'9"